NGC 1929 (also known as ESO 56-EN107) is an open cluster associated with the emission nebula located within the N44 nebula in the Dorado constellation and part of the Large Magellanic Cloud. It was discovered by James Dunlop on August 3 1826. Its apparent magnitude is 14.0, and its size is 0.8 arc minutes.

References

External links
 

Emission nebulae
open clusters
ESO objects
1929
Dorado (constellation)
Astronomical objects discovered in 1826
Large Magellanic Cloud